The Canadian women's national cricket team is the team that represents the country of Canada in international women's cricket matches. They made their international debut in September 2006 in a three match series of one-day games against Bermuda to decide which team would represent the Americas region in the Women's Cricket World Cup Qualifier in Ireland in 2007. Canada started well, with a five wicket win in the first win - Game 1, but Bermuda came back with 24 run win in the second - Game 2. The third game went down to the wire, with Bermuda triumphing by just 3 runs - Game 3.

In 2007 Canada won the inaugural ICC Americas Championship held in Toronto, Ontario, Canada.  They recorded victories over Argentina and Bermuda. They also played an exhibition game against Trinidad and Tobago under-17s.

In 2009 Canada successfully defended the ICC Americas Championship in Florida, United States, with wins in the T20 portion of the competition over Argentina and Bermuda.  Following this, they defeated the United States and had a washout versus Argentina which left them atop the points table.

In 2010 a regional qualifier was held in Toronto Canada between Canada and the United States. Canada lost all three 50 over matches, Game 1, Game 2, Game 3 resulting in the United States qualifying for the World Cup qualifier held in Bangladesh 2011.  Canada did however win both T20 games held following the qualifier,  Game 1 and Game 2.

In 2012 the ICC Americas T20 Women's Championship was held in the Cayman Islands.  Canada registered wins over Brazil,  Bermuda, Cayman Islands, and Argentina. The final match versus the United States was a washout, resulting in Canada winning the tournament with a superior net run rate.

In April 2018, the International Cricket Council (ICC) granted full Women's Twenty20 International (WT20I) status to all its members. Therefore, all Twenty20 matches played between Canada women and another international side since 1 July 2018 have been full WT20I matches.

In December 2020, the ICC announced the qualification pathway for the 2023 ICC Women's T20 World Cup. Canada were named in the 2021 ICC Women's T20 World Cup Americas Qualifier regional group, alongside three other teams.

Tournament history

ICC Women's T20 World Cup Americas Qualifier
 2019: 2nd (DNQ)
 2021: 3rd (DNQ)

ICC Women's Americas Championship
 2007: Winner
 2009: Winner
 2012: Winner

Records and statistics 

International Match Summary — Canada Women
 
Last updated 25 October 2021

Twenty20 International 

T20I record versus other nations

Records complete to WT20I #994. Last updated 25 October 2021.

See also
 List of Canada women Twenty20 International cricketers
 Canada national cricket team

References

Cricke
Women's national cricket teams
Women